Royal Botanic Gardens or Royal Botanical Gardens may refer to:

Australia 
 Royal Botanic Gardens, Cranbourne
 Royal Botanic Gardens, Melbourne
 Royal Botanic Garden, Sydney
 Royal Tasmanian Botanical Gardens, Hobart

Canada
 Royal Botanical Gardens (Ontario), Burlington and Hamilton, Ontario

India
 Royal Botanic Gardens, now the Acharya Jagadish Chandra Bose Indian Botanic Garden, Calcutta

Jordan
 Royal Botanic Gardens of Jordan

Spain
 Royal Botanical Garden of Madrid

Sri Lanka
 Royal Botanical Gardens, Peradeniya, Sri Lanka

Trinidad and Tobago
 Royal Botanic Gardens, Trinidad, Port of Spain

United Kingdom 
 Royal Belfast Botanical Gardens, Northern Ireland
 Royal Botanic Garden Edinburgh, Scotland
 Royal Botanic Gardens, Kew, England

See also 
 Royal Gardens (disambiguation)